Olivier Nzuzi Niati Polo (born September 16, 1980) is a Congolese football player.

He was part of the Congolese 2004 African Nations Cup team, who finished bottom of their group in the first round of competition, thus failing to secure qualification for the quarter-finals.

External links

1980 births
Living people
Footballers from Kinshasa
Democratic Republic of the Congo footballers
Democratic Republic of the Congo expatriate footballers
Democratic Republic of the Congo international footballers
R.W.D. Molenbeek players
Cercle Brugge K.S.V. players
Royal Excel Mouscron players
SK Sturm Graz players
SW Bregenz players
Belgian Pro League players
Challenger Pro League players
Austrian Football Bundesliga players
Expatriate footballers in Belgium
Expatriate footballers in Austria
2004 African Cup of Nations players
Democratic Republic of the Congo expatriate sportspeople in Belgium
Association football wingers
FC Renaissance du Congo players